Song is the pinyin transliteration of the Chinese family name 宋. It is transliterated as Sung in Wade-Giles, and Soong is also a common transliteration. In addition to being a common surname, it is also the name of a Chinese dynasty, the Song dynasty, written with the same character.

In 2019 it was  the 24th most common surname in Mainland China.

Historical origin

The first written record of the character 宋 was found on the oracle bones of the Shang dynasty, and Song is the formal inherited state of the dynasty. From Yinxu heritage population bore genetic testing, it has resemblance in mtDNA haplogroup to the northern Han Chinese consisted of the northern Han 72.1%, Tibeto-Burman 18% and Altaic populations 9.9%, which related to surname Zi.

State of  Song
In the written records of Chinese history, the first time the character Song was used as a surname appeared in the early stage of the Zhou dynasty. One of the children of the last emperor of Shang dynasty, Weizi Qi (微子启), was a duke owned state named Song, the descent of his ancestor Xie (契), derived from surname Zi (子). Xie was born by Jiandi from swallow of black bird egg, who came from Yousong (有娀) the legendary state. The State of Song, Song's personal dominion, became part of the Zhou dynasty after the fall of the Shang dynasty, inherited the dynasty formally in 11th century BC. Citizens of the former State of Song  commemorate to the overthrow of their state in 286 BC by the State of Qi owned by Tian, whom began to use the character Song as their surname, which is the authentic branch mainly.

Song dynasty
Emperor Huizong of Song's officer changed to name Song, using dynasty name as family name, who is imperial clan branch of Song dynasty.  
Charlie Soong was Changed his family name from Han to Soon, then Soong, which was on of accepted English spellings of the dynasty name Song, the dynasty from the tenth to the thirteenth century in China.

Others

A branch of Miao people located in Guizhou announced that they are descendants of State of Song historically, called Songjia (宋家), known as Chiefdom of Shuidong afterwards, who had a sub-branch merged into Luodian Kingdom as Yi-speaking people.

Otherwise, a clan of Xiqiang (西羌) people was submitted to Northern Wei dynasty during Southern and Northern Dynasties period in the year AD 518, using that surname. Previously, there was a person called Song Jian (宋建) from Fuhan, who was one of the leaders of Liang Province rebellion belonged to Qiang tribes. 

Moreover, the surname contains a branch clan derived from an ancestor named Temuer or Timur (帖木儿) with grant of seal, used the character since Ming dynasty. And there is another family clan origin located in Pingyang called Dashila (答失剌), who used this character in the same dynasty.

Blood type distribution

Population of surname Song's ABO blood type distribution is O blood type 31.3%, B blood type 30.6%, A blood type 28.4% and AB blood type 9.7%.

Variations
A less common Chinese family name (崇 pinyin Chóng) can also be transliterated to Soong in some Chinese dialects.

The surname is also used in Korea.

In Vietnam, the surname is pronounced as Tống.

Notable people

Historical figures
 Song Wuji, Zhou dynasty fangshi of Fangxian Tao in State of Yan 
 Song Yu, Zhou dynasty poet
 Song Yi (died 207 BC), minister of Chu
 Consort Song, Han dynasty empress
 Empress Song (Han dynasty), Han dynasty empress
 Song Qian, Eastern Wu military officer in the Three Kingdoms era
 Song Hun, d. 361, regent of the Chinese state Former Liang during the Sixteen Kingdoms era
 Song Bian, Northern Wei official, during Southern and Northern Dynasties period
 Song Zhiwen, b. 656, early Tang dynasty poet 
 Song Jing, b. 663, Tang dynasty chancellor
 Song Shenxi, d. 833, Tang dynasty chancellor
 Song Wentong, b. 856, Tang dynasty warlord, changed surname to Li since 886
 Song Jingyang, b.911, local chief administrative officer became Tusi chieftain of Chiefdom of Shuidong
 Song Shou, b. 991, Song dynasty assistant administer of political affairs
 Song Di, b. ca. 1015, Song dynasty scholar-official and artist
 Song Ci, b. 1186, Song dynasty writer of Collected Cases of Injustice Rectified
 Song Zhun, Song dynasty scholar
 Song Lian, b. 1310, Ming dynasty historian
 Song Maojin, b. 1368, Ming dynasty landscape painter
 Song Xu, b. 1525, Ming dynasty landscape painter
 Song Maocheng, b. 1570, Ming dynasty writer, changed surname from Zhao family clan
 Song Yingxing, b. 1587, Ming dynasty scientist and encyclopedist
 Song Wan, b. 1614, Qing dynasty Chinese poet and government official

Modern figures
 Song Yuren, b. 1857, early period positive reformist philosopher
 Charlie Soong, b. 1863, missionary and businessman, several of whose children were highly influential in early 20th century China:
 children include (see, chronologically, below): Soong sisters (Soong Ai-ling, Soong Ching-ling and Soong Mei-ling), and their brother T. V. Soong
 Sir Song Ong Siang, b. 1871, Singaporean lawyer and Knight Commander of the Order of the British Empire
 Song Shijie, b. 1873, Chinese revolutionary
 Song Jiaoren, b. 1882, President of the Kuomintang
 Song Zheyuan, b. 1885, Kuomintang general
 Soong Ai-ling, b. 1890, wife of H. H. Kung
 Soong Ching-ling, b. 1893, wife of Sun Yat Sen and Vice chairman of the People's Republic of China
 T. V. Soong, b. 1894, businessman and Premier of the Republic of China
 Soong Mei-ling, b. 1897, wife of Chiang Kai-shek
 Song Shi-Lun, b. 1899, PLA general
 Song Renqiong, b. 1909, PLA general
 Song Ping, b. 1917, Communist Party official
 Song Xi, b. 1920, former President of the Chinese Culture University
 Song Jian, b. 1931, aerospace engineer, demographer, and politician
 James Soong, b. 1942, Republic of China governor
 Song Defu (politician), b. 1946, Communist Party politician
 Sung, Chi-li, b. 1948, Taiwanese religious leader
 Song Tao, b. 1955, diplomat and politician
 Song Xiaobo, b. 1958, female basketball player and coach
 Song Dandan, b. 1961, actress
 Song Lianyong, b. 1965, football player from Hong Kong
 Song Tao, b. 1965, basketball player
 Song Zuying, b. 1966, ethnic Miao Chinese singer
 Song Ligang, b. 1967, Chinese basketball player
 Song Weiping, b. 1967, billionaire
 Song Zude, b. 1968, entertainment manager
 Anna Song, b. 1976, Taiwanese American journalist
 Song Aimin, b. 1978, discus thrower
 Devon Song, b. 1980, Taiwanese singer-songwriter
 Song Lun, b. 1981, figure skater
 Song Zhenyu, b. 1981, football player
 Song Hongjuan, b. 1984, Chinese race walker
 Sarah Song, b. 1985, Miss Chinese International 2007
 Song Qian b. 1987, leader of the female South Korean group f(x)
 Song Yuqi, b. 1999, dancer, singer, member of the South Korean group (G)I-DLE
 Song Dan, b. 1990, female Chinese javelin thrower
 Song Nan, b. 1990, figure skater
 Sung Chia-Hao, b. 1992, Taiwanese baseball pitcher who plays with Tohoku Rakuten Golden Eagles
 Song Andong, b. 1997, first Chinese-born ice hockey player ever drafted by an NHL pro team (2015)
 Sung Yu-hsieh, b.1956, former Minister of Research, Development and Evaluation Commission of the Republic of China
 Jeannette Song, Chinese and American management scientist
 Sung Nien-yu, Taiwanese singer, songwriter, and record producer
 Song Weilong, b. 1999, Chinese actor and model
 Song Yaxuan, b. 2004, Chinese singer and actor

Fictional characters
 Song Jiang, major character in 14th century novel Water Margin, one of the Four Great Classical Novels of Chinese literature
 Song Qing younger brother of Song Jiang
 Song Wan, fictional character in the Water Margin
 Song Yiren, character featured within the famed Ming dynasty novel Investiture of the Gods
 Song Yuanqiao, b. 1295, character in novel The Heaven Sword and Dragon Saber by Jin Yong
 Song Qingshu, son of Song Yuanqiao
 Noonien Soong, The creator of the android Data in Star Trek
 Arik Soong, great grandfather of Noonien Soong

See also
Song (Korean name)
Brenda Song, b. 1988, 熊 (original surname Xiong (熊; Xyooj in Hmong), but changed their last name to Song when the family immigrated to the United States
Xirong

References

Chinese-language surnames
Individual Chinese surnames